The Hon. Peregrine David Euan Malcolm Hay, later Moncreiffe of that Ilk, Baron of Easter Moncreiffe and Chief of Clan Moncreiffe (born 16 February 1951), is the second son of Sir Iain Moncreiffe of that Ilk, 11th Baronet Moncreiffe and Diana Denyse Hay, 23rd Countess of Errol. He is also the younger brother of Sir Merlin Sereld Victor Gilbert Hay, 12th Baronet Moncreiffe, 24th Earl of Erroll and Chief of Clan Hay.

Biography
He was educated at Eton and Christ Church, Oxford. While at Christ Church he rowed for Oxford at number 7 in the 1972 Boat Race; this was a bleak period for Oxford and his crew lost by nine and a half lengths. He became an investment banker and later became a Freeman of the City of London and a Liveryman of the Worshipful Company of Fishmongers.

He is a Member of the Royal Company of Archers. He also served as Slains Pursuivant from 1970 until his mother's death in 1978. He became Chief of Clan Moncreiffe and the feudal Baron of Easter Moncreiffe, Perthshire (the Clan's seat) in 1998 upon the death of his cousin, Miss Elizabeth Moncreiffe of that Ilk, the previous Chief (1985–1998). He was recognized as "Moncreiffe of that Ilk" by the Lord Lyon King of Arms and granted arms by the Court of the Lord Lyon on 11 January 2001; in Scotland, only his eldest brother would have arms by inheritance.

He married Miranda Mary Fox-Pitt (born 29 December 1968) younger daughter of Mervyn Fox-Pitt and a descendant of General Augustus Pitt Rivers on 27 July 1988. They have the following issue:
Ossian Peregrine Thomas Gerald (b. 3 February 1991)
Idina May Moncreiffe (b. 3 November 1992) 
Eliza Miranda Moncreiffe (b. 2 February 1995)
Alexandra Maria Moncreiffe (b. 19 November 1996)
Lily Moncreiffe (b. 6 November 1998)
Euan Moncreiffe (b. 12 September 2000)

Peregrine Moncreiffe and his family now live in the Channel Islands, as of 2010.

References

Dewar, Peter Beauclerk (Ed.). Burke's Landed Gentry of Great Britain: Together with members of the titled and non-titled contemporary establishment (Volume 1) London: Burke's Peerage (2001) p. 642.
Dodd, Christopher. The Oxford & Cambridge Boat Race (London 1983) p. 344.

1951 births
Living people
Alumni of Christ Church, Oxford
British bankers
Members of the Royal Company of Archers
Oxford University Boat Club rowers
People educated at Eton College
Scottish clan chiefs
Younger sons of baronets
Younger sons of earls